Alfdorf is a municipality in the Rems-Murr district of Baden-Württemberg, Germany.

History
The municipality of Alfdorf was formed in 1972 by the merging of the municipalities of Alfdorf, Pfahlbronn, and Vordersteinenberg.

Geography
The municipality (Gemeinde) of Alfdorf lies at the easternmost extremity of the Rems-Murr district, along its border with the Ostalb district. Alfdorf is physically located in the Schurwald and Welzheim Forest, regions of the larger Swabian-Franconian Forest. Elevation above sea level in the municipal area ranges from a high of  Normalnull (NN) to a low of  NN.

Portions of the Federally protected , Rottal zwischen Hüttenbühl und Buchengehren, and Wiesentäler bei der Menzlesmühle nature reserves are located in Alfdorf's municipal area.

Politics
Alfdorf has three boroughs (Ortsteile), Alfdorf, Pfahlbronn, and Vordersteinenberg, and 64 villages. The abandoned villages of Eisenmühle, Felgensägmühle, Geiersweiler, Geren, Tierbad, and Webersgehren are found in the municipal area.

Coat of arms
Alfdorf's municipal coat of arms displays a blue lily with a beech bundle and an oak acorn, in green, growing on a green, three-pointed hill in front of a black fence with four posts upon a field of yellow. The lily is a motif of Alfdorf dated to as early as 1550, which occasionally sported additional acorns. The fence refers to Pfahlbronn and the hill Vordersteinenberg. This coat of arms was awarded to Alfdorf with a municipal flag by the Rems-Murr district office on 19 May 1980.

Transportation

References

External links

  (in German)

Rems-Murr-Kreis
Württemberg